Joseph Johnson (born May 5, 1994) is an American former competitive ice dancer.

Early life 
Johnson was born on May 5, 1994. He began skating in 2003.

Career 
Since 2013, he has competed with Karina Manta in ice dance. Before he partnered with Manta, Johnson had competed with Tori Patsis and Paolina Bushur. Manta and Johnson are coached by Patti Gottwein in Colorado Springs. The team received their first Grand Prix assignment in 2018, competing at Skate America. They finished in 10th place with a total score of 139.33.

Johnson announced his retirement from competitive figure skating on April 18, 2019. He and Manta plan to move to Montreal in June and join Cirque du Soleil.

In 2021 he joined ITV’s show Dancing on Ice series 13 as a professional skater. He was paired up with the gymnastic medalist Amy Tinkler in his first series and Love Island star Liberty Poole in his second series, 2022.

Programs

Competitive Highlights 
GP: Grand Prix; CS: Challenger Series

(with Karina Manta)

References 

American male ice dancers
LGBT figure skaters
American LGBT sportspeople
Living people
1994 births
Gay sportsmen
LGBT dancers